Creative Capital China is a Chinese design firm located in Shanghai.

History
The firm was founded in Shanghai, China by Louis Houdart in 2010. It also has offices in Shenzhen and New York. Houdart serves as the CEO, Gianvito d’Onghia is the managing partner of the firm in Shenzhen.

Work 
The company has worked with European lifestyle companies in China as well as pushing little-known Chinese brands in Western markets. Creative Capital China is one of the only companies in China that focuses on widening awareness of Chinese companies in non-Chinese markets. They also help companies with rebranding during seasonal periods, such as Chinese New Year. In addition to international outreach, Creative Capital also markets local Chinese companies within the domestic region in order for them to compete with foreign competition, including promoting foreign festival like Valentine's Day in China. Their work includes the production of campaigns and retail store design. Companies that Creative Capital have worked with include Saint James, Lancôme, Dom Perignon, Baume & Mercier, Aimer, and GoodBaby.

Design work
Creative Capital has also created two eyewear brands in China, as well as retail store designs for children's goods. They are also design partners of the retail chains 16th North and Kitchen Spring.

References

Companies based in Shanghai
Design companies of China
Design companies established in 2010
Chinese companies established in 2010